Hayatun Najihin Binti Radzuan (born September 4, 1998) is a Malaysian professional mixed martial artist, currently competes in the Atomweight division for ONE Championship.

Mixed martial arts career

ONE Championship
In the promotional debut, Radzuan faced Puja Tomar on March 9, 2018, at ONE: Visions of Victory. She won the fight via a triangle choke submission in the second round.

Radzuan faced Priscilla Hertati Lumban Gaol on July 13, 2018, at ONE: Pursuit of Power. She won the fight via unanimous decision.

Radzuan faced Jenny Huang on December 7, 2018, at ONE: Destiny of Champions. She won the fight via unanimous decision.

Radzuan faced Gina Iniong on February 16, 2019, at ONE: Clash of Legends. She lost the fight via split decision.

Radzuan faced Jomary Torres on July 12, 2019, at ONE: Masters Of Destiny. She won the fight via a triangle choke submission in the first round.

Radzuan faced Denice Zamboanga on December 6, 2019, at ONE: Mark Of Greatness. She lost the fight via unanimous decision.

Radzuan faced Bi Nguyen on December 4, 2020, at ONE: Big Bang. She won the fight via unanimous decision.

Radzuan was scheduled to face Jenelyn Olsim on February 11, 2022, at ONE: Bad Blood. However, Olsim withdrew due to injury and was replaced by Mei Yamaguchi. She won the fight via unanimous decision.

Radzuan faced Itsuki Hirata on March 26, 2022, at ONE: X. She won the fight via split decision.

Radzuan faced Stamp Fairtex on October 1, 2022, at ONE on Prime Video 2. At the weigh-ins, Radzuan weighed in at 120.25 pounds, 5.25 lbs over the atomweight non-title fight limit. Radzuan was fined 30% of their purse, which went to their opponent Stamp. She lost the fight by unanimous decision.

Championships and accomplishments

Amateur title
Malaysian Invasion MMA
MIMMA Women's Flyweight Championship (One time)
MIMMA Women's Flyweight Tournament Winner

Kickboxing
 Southeast Asian Games
  2021 Southeast Asian Games Women's Kickboxing Low Kick 60kg – Third place

Mixed martial arts record

|-
| Loss
| align=center| 8–3
| Stamp Fairtex
| Decision (unanimous)
| ONE on Prime Video 2 
| 
| align=center| 3
| align=center| 5:00
| Kallang, Singapore
| 
|-
| Win
| align=center| 8–2
| Itsuki Hirata
| Decision (split)
| ONE: X 
| 
| align=center| 3
| align=center| 5:00
| Kallang, Singapore
|
|-
| Win
| align=center| 7–2
| Mei Yamaguchi
| Decision (unanimous)
| ONE: Bad Blood
| 
| align=center| 3
| align=center| 5:00
| Kallang, Singapore
|
|-
| Win
| align=center| 6–2
| Bi Nguyen
| Decision (unanimous)
| ONE: Big Bang 
| 
| align=center| 3
| align=center| 5:00
| Kallang, Singapore
|
|-
| Loss
| align=center| 5–2
| Denice Zamboanga
| Decision (unanimous)
| ONE: Mark Of Greatness 
| 
| align=center| 3
| align=center| 5:00
| Kuala Lumpur, Malaysia
|
|-
| Win
| align=center| 5–1
| Jomary Torres
| Submission (triangle choke) 
| ONE: Masters Of Destiny
| 
| align=center| 1
| align=center| 3:07
| Kuala Lumpur, Malaysia
|
|-
| Loss
| align=center| 4–1
| Gina Iniong
| Decision (split)
| ONE: Clash of Legends
| 
| align=center| 3
| align=center| 5:00
| Bangkok, Thailand
|
|-
| Win
| align=center| 4–0
| Jenny Huang
| Decision (unanimous)
| ONE: Destiny of Champions
| 
| align=center| 3
| align=center| 5:00
| Kuala Lumpur, Malaysia
|
|-
| Win
| align=center| 3–0
| Priscilla Hertati Lumban Gaol
| Decision (unanimous)
| ONE: Pursuit of Power
| 
| align=center| 3
| align=center| 5:00
| Kuala Lumpur, Malaysia 
|
|-
| Win
| align=center| 2–0
| Puja Tomar
| Submission (triangle choke)
| ONE: Visions of Victory
| 
| align=center| 2
| align=center| 2:23
| Kuala Lumpur, Malaysia 
| 
|-
| Win
| align=center| 1–0
| Masrina Hamka
| TKO (punches)
| Ultimate Beatdown 23
| 
| align=center| 1
| align=center| 2:21
| Johor Bahru, Malaysia 
|

Amateur mixed martial arts record

|-
| Loss
| align=center| 6–2
| Gabriella Ringblom
| Decision (unanimous)
| 2017 IMMAF Asian Open Championships
| 
| align=center| 3
| align=center| 3:00
| Marina Bay, Singapore 
| 
|-
| Win
| align=center| 6–1
| Joanna Yap
| Decision (unanimous)
| Malaysian Invasion 4: Grand Finals
| 
| align=center| 5
| align=center| 3:00
| Kuala Lumpur, Malaysia 
| 
|-
| Win
| align=center| 5–1
| Nur Sabrina
| Decision (unanimous)
| Malaysian Invasion 4: Contender Fight
| 
| align=center| 3
| align=center| 3:00
| Selangor, Malaysia 
| 
|-
| Win
| align=center| 4–1
| Koh Ling Bee
| Submission (armbar)
| Malaysian Invasion 4: Semifinals
| 
| align=center| N/A
| align=center| N/A
| Selangor, Malaysia 
| 
|-
| Win
| align=center| 3–1
| Nur Sabrina
| Submission (armbar)
| Malaysian Invasion 4: Quarterfinals
| 
| align=center| 1
| align=center| N/A
| Selangor, Malaysia 
| 
|-
| Win
| align=center| 2–1
| Nur Aishah
| Submission (armbar)
| Ultimate Beatdown 18
| 
| align=center| 1
| align=center| 0:43
| Johor Bahru, Malaysia 
|
|-
| Loss
| align=center| 1–1
| Mardiana Binti Mohd Maulana
| TKO (punches)
| Malaysian Invasion 3: Ladder Match
| 
| align=center| 3
| align=center| 2:30
| Kuala Lumpur, Malaysia 
| 
|-
| Win
| align=center| 1–0
| Normaszatulhuda binti Mohd Nazri
| TKO (punches)
| Ultimate Beatdown 16
| 
| align=center| 1
| align=center| 1:15
| Johor Bahru, Malaysia 
|

See also 
List of current ONE fighters

References

External links 
Jihin Radzuan in ONE Championship

1986 births
Living people
Malaysian people of Malay descent
People from Johor Bahru
Malaysian female mixed martial artists
Mixed martial artists utilizing Muay Thai
Mixed martial artists utilizing wushu
Mixed martial artists utilizing Brazilian jiu-jitsu
Malaysian Muay Thai practitioners
Malaysian wushu practitioners
Female Muay Thai practitioners